Vampire Hunter D 1 may refer to:

 Vampire Hunter D Volume 1 (novel), the first novel
 Vampire Hunter D (1985 film), the first film
 Hideyuki Kikuchi's Vampire Hunter D Volume 1 (manga), the first manga volume